Selliner See is a lake at Ravensruh, city of Neukloster in Nordwestmecklenburg, Mecklenburg-Vorpommern, Germany. At an elevation of 48.5 m, its surface area is 0.127 km².

Lakes of Mecklenburg-Western Pomerania